Aleksander Allila (born 14 April 1890) was a Finnish politician and member of the Parliament of Finland, the national legislature. A member of the Socialist Electoral Organisation of Workers and Smallholders, he represented Uusimaa between May 1924 and September 1927.

Allila was born on 14 April 1890 in Suistamo. He worked as a painter in Suistamo until 1912 and in Helsinki from 1912. Allila was imprisoned for political reasons in 1918 following the end of the Finnish Civil War.

In January 1923 the Court of Appeal of Turku convicted Allila of three counts of inciting a crime in a speech he gave in the autumn of 1921. He was sentenced to one month of imprisonment but the sentence was not implemented. However, in the spring of 1926, whilst a serving Member of Parliament, he was sent to prison. He moved to the Soviet Union in 1932. He was in a labour camp in Leningrad in 1933.

References

1890 births
Finnish prisoners and detainees
Members of the Parliament of Finland (1924–27)
People from Karelia
Political prisoners
Prisoners and detainees of Finland
Socialist Electoral Organisation of Workers and Smallholders politicians
Year of death unknown